WAHR (99.1 FM, "Star 99.1") is an American mainstream adult contemporary music-formatted radio station licensed to serve Huntsville, Alabama. The station is licensed to Southern Stone Communications, LLC. The signal covers most of northern Alabama and southern central Tennessee. WAHR is one of the top-rated radio stations in the Huntsville market.  Its studios are located off University Drive (U.S. 72) in Huntsville, and its transmitter is located north of the city.

History
WAHR was founded in 1959 by Huntsville businessman Arnold Hornbuckle. It was Alabama's first stand-alone FM radio station, without an AM companion. The call letters stood for 'Arnold Hornbuckle Records.' At the time of licensing, he owned Hornbuckle's Record Shop, also in Huntsville. Shortly after the station began broadcasting, Bill Lane became the station's manager and a minority shareholder. Lane retired in 1990.

In the early 1960s, a signature station phrase was "Broadcasting from the top of the Times Building". Some of the station's early operators were U.S. Army servicemen stationed at Redstone Arsenal and promotional literature included a letter from Dr. Wernher von Braun complimenting the station on its classical music programs. By the 1970s, though, the station had dropped fine arts programming in favor of what became known as adult contemporary music, which is roughly its present format; public station WLRH took over classical broadcasting to the area when it began in 1976. After nearly 40 years serving the Tennessee Valley, Hornbuckle retired, selling the station in July 1999. In 2009, Hornbuckle was inducted into the Alabama Broadcasters Association Hall of Fame. He died in 2012.

WAHR is currently owned by Black Crow Media Group whose other local radio stations include WRTT-FM and WLOR. In November 2001, due to a proposed refinancing of the parent company, license holder STG Media, LLC, applied to the FCC to transfer the licenses of WAHR, WLOR, and WRTT-FM to Black Crow Media Group subsidiary BCA Media, LLC. Just two days later, another application was filed to shift the licenses to BCA Radio, LLC. The FCC approved the moves on November 15, 2001, and the consummation of the transaction occurred on November 19, 2001.

In June 2009, the station transitioned from an adult contemporary music format to a Hot AC music mix. As of May 2013, though, the station had returned to its former mainstream AC format.

In January 2010, Black Crow Media Group and its subsidiaries filed for "Chapter 11" bankruptcy, seeking to reorganize rather than be broken up. Their filing with the FCC notified the Commission of the involuntary transfer of the license from BCA Radio, LLC, to an entity known as BCA Radio, LLC, Debtor-In-Possession.

In November 2011, Black Crow Media Group announced that it was reorganizing its radio holdings and consolidating the four subsidiaries acting as debtors in possession (including BCA Radio, LLC) into a new company named Southern Stone Communications, LLC. The FCC approved the transfer on December 19, 2011.

Awards
In November 2007, WAHR won the American Cancer Society's Mid-South Division award for best radio supporter for 2006-07. The station was cited for having "strongly supported" the ACS's Relay for Life, gala, golf tournament and other events sponsored by the national and local cancer organizations.

References

External links

AHR
Mainstream adult contemporary radio stations in the United States
Radio stations established in 1959
1959 establishments in Alabama